The 2009 Spa Formula Two round was the third round of the 2009 FIA Formula Two Championship season. It was held on 27 and 28 June 2009 at Circuit de Spa-Francorchamps at Spa, Belgium. The weekend was dominated by Tobias Hegewald, who took two poles, won both races and got fastest lap for both races.

Classification

Qualifying 1

Qualifying 2

Race 1

Race 2

Standings after the race
Drivers' Championship standings

References

FIA Formula Two Championship